Geoffrey David Crook (born 30 October 1978) is a former English cricketer.  Crook was a left-handed batsman who bowled left-arm fast-medium.  He was born in Cambridge, Cambridgeshire.

Crook made his debut for Staffordshire in the 2000 Minor Counties Championship against Bedfordshire.  Crook played Minor counties cricket for Staffordshire from 2000 to 2002, which included 5 Minor Counties Championship matches and 3 MCCA Knockout Trophy matches.  In 2002, he made his only List A appearance against Warwickshire in the Cheltenham & Gloucester Trophy.  In this match, he took 2 wickets for 43 runs from 10 overs.  With the bat he was dismissed for a duck by Alan Richardson.

References

External links
Geoffrey Crook at ESPNcricinfo
Geoffrey Crook at CricketArchive

1978 births
Living people
Cricketers from Cambridgeshire
Sportspeople from Cambridge
English cricketers
Staffordshire cricketers